Anthony Joseph (born March 1, 1969) is a Canadian former professional ice hockey right winger who played two games in the National Hockey League as a member of the Winnipeg Jets.

References

1969 births
Living people
Canadian ice hockey right wingers
Ice hockey people from Ontario
Kalamazoo Wings (1974–2000) players
Moncton Hawks players
Oshawa Generals players
Salt Lake Golden Eagles (IHL) players
Sportspeople from Cornwall, Ontario
Tappara players
Winnipeg Jets (1979–1996) draft picks
Winnipeg Jets (1979–1996) players